Danny Cullen (born 1987/8) is a hurler. He plays for Setanta, the Donegal county team and the Ireland national team.

He has won three Nicky Rackard Cups and represented Ireland against Scotland in the Shinty-Hurling International Series.

Playing career

Club and college
Cullen's grandfather, Danny Snr, was a founder of Setanta in 1979. He (the grandson) won a Donegal Senior Hurling Championship in 2017. Setanta followed this with an Ulster Junior Club Hurling Championship, also in 2017. He won another Donegal SHC in 2019, scoring 0–1 in the final.

Cullen has coached under-age teams for his club.

He played for NUI Galway.

Inter-county
Cullen made his debut for Donegal at the age of 16. He has also captained his county.

He was part of a delegation to Croke Park who staged a sit-in as part of their effort to free Donegal manager Eamonn Campbell from suspension for the 2009 Lory Meagher Cup final against Tyrone.

Cullen won the 2013 Nicky Rackard Cup with Donegal, playing in the final against Roscommon and scoring three points.

He played for Donegal during the 2018 National Hurling League, when the county recorded their first competitive victories over Derry and Down. He later cited the Down victory as important to him, since Down versus Tipperary in the 1997 All-Ireland Senior Hurling Championship semi-final was the first hurling match he attended at Croke Park. Donegal also defeated Armagh in the closing game of that league campaign. They went on to win the 2018 Nicky Rackard Cup.

Cullen featured in the 2016 Champions 15. He was also a Champions 15 nominee in 2019. He was named on the 2020 Champions 15 team and also received the Nicky Rackard Hurler of the Year following Donegal's earlier victory in the 2020 Nicky Rackard Cup Final. He scored three points in the final.

By the end of 2022, Cullen had made 153 appearances for Donegal (more than any other panel member), with Seán McVeigh — who retired that year — in second place, ending on 129 appearances.

International
Cullen was selected to play for Ireland against Scotland in the Shinty–Hurling International Series played over two games at Croke Park in Dublin and Bught Park in Inverness in 2013.  He was also selected for the Inverness contest at Bught Park in 2018. Ireland lost. He captained the Ireland team for the Abbotstown contest in 2019, and was his county's only representative in that year's squad. Though he scored, Ireland lost.

Personal life
Cullen's sister, Ciara, is married to Declan Coulter.

He appeared in a short film on hurling made by a CNN-owned company based in New York and London.

He had a honeymoon in 2022.

Honours
Setanta
 Ulster Junior Club Hurling Championship: 2017
 Donegal Senior Hurling Championship: 2017, 2019

Donegal
 Nicky Rackard Cup: 2013, 2018, 2020
 National Hurling League Division 3A: 2020

Individual
 Donegal Hurler of the Year: 2013
 Champions 15: 2016, 2020
 Nicky Rackard Hurler of the Year: 2020

References

1980s births
Living people
Donegal inter-county hurlers
Hurling coaches
Ireland international hurlers
University of Galway hurlers
Setanta hurlers